is a Japanese comedy manga series by Mari Yamazaki. It was serialized in Shueisha's seinen manga magazine Grand Jump from March 2018 to July 2022, with its chapters collected in seven tankōbon volumes. An anime television series adaptation titled Bessatsu Olympia Kyklos aired from April to November 2020.

Characters

Media

Manga
Written and illustrated by Mari Yamazaki, Olympia Kyklos was serialized in Shueisha's seinen manga magazine Grand Jump from March 20, 2018, to July 6, 2022. Its chapters were collected in seven tankōbon published from July 19, 2018, to September 16, 2022.

Anime
An anime television series adaptation was announced in the 11th issue of Weekly Shōnen Jump magazine on February 10, 2020.  The clay-animated short series, titled , is directed by Ryō Fujii, with Fujii, Atsushi Tsuboi and Takeshi Takemura handling series composition. It aired from April 20 to November 2, 2020, on Tokyo MX. Crunchyroll has licensed the anime for streaming. On May 4, 2020, it was announced that episode 5 and later episodes would be delayed due to the ongoing COVID-19 pandemic. It returned on June 22, 2020.

See also
Thermae Romae – Another manga series by the same author

References

External links
 
 

Anime postponed due to the COVID-19 pandemic
Anime series based on manga
Comedy anime and manga
Comics about time travel
Comics set in ancient Greece
Crunchyroll anime
Seinen manga
Shueisha manga
Tokyo MX original programming
Works about the Summer Olympics
Anime productions suspended due to the COVID-19 pandemic